Michael Laurence Birkbeck (born March 10, 1961) is a college baseball coach and former baseball pitcher. He is the pitching coach at Kent State University.

Birkbeck attended Orrville High School in Orrville, Ohio and played college baseball at the University of Akron. Birkbeck's professional career was plagued by injury played for the Milwaukee Brewers, New York Mets, and the Yokohama BayStars of Nippon Professional Baseball. It was with Yokohama that Birkbeck suffered a broken fibula on a comebacker from Shane Mack which effectively ended his career. He retired as a player in 1996.

In six MLB seasons, Birkbeck had a 12–19 win–loss record, 54 games pitched (51 started), two complete games,  innings pitched, 319 hits allowed, 158 runs allowed, 146 earned runs allowed, 27 home runs allowed, 93 walks allowed, 149 strikeouts, four hit batters, eight wild pitches, 1,196 batters faced, four intentional walks, 12 balks and a 4.86 ERA.

Birkbeck was hired as the pitching coach for the Kent State Golden Flashes in 1997 and was later promoted to associate head coach. In 2012, he was named the ABCA/Baseball America Assistant Coach of the Year.

References

External links

Major League Baseball pitchers
Baseball players from Ohio
Milwaukee Brewers players
New York Mets players
American expatriate baseball players in Japan
Yokohama BayStars players
Canton-Akron Indians players
Richmond Braves players
Akron Zips baseball players
Kent State Golden Flashes baseball coaches
1961 births
Living people
People from Orrville, Ohio
American expatriate baseball players in Canada
Beloit Brewers players
Colorado Springs Sky Sox players
Denver Zephyrs players
El Paso Diablos players
Norfolk Tides players
Paintsville Brewers players
Tidewater Tides players
Vancouver Canadians players